Montoro Inferiore is a former comune (municipality) in the province of Avellino, Campania, Italy.
 
Following a referendum, the municipality was officially disestablished on 3 December 2013; after being merged, with Montoro Superiore, in the new municipality of Montoro.

See also
Montoro, Campania
Montoro Superiore

References

Former municipalities of Campania
Montoro, Campania